Victor Thomas Trumper (2 November 1877 – 28 June 1915) was an Australian cricketer known as the most stylish and versatile batsman of the Golden Age of cricket, capable of playing match-winning innings on wet wickets his contemporaries found unplayable. Archie MacLaren said of him, "Compared to Victor I was a cab-horse to a Derby winner". Trumper was also a key figure in the foundation of rugby league in Australia.

Early life
Trumper was probably born in Sydney; no definite record of his birth exists. Trumper's parents are believed to be Charles Thomas Trumper and his wife Louisa Alice "Louie", née Coghlan.

Trumper was educated at Crown Street Superior Public School and showed early ability as a batsman. When only 17 years old Trumper made 67 runs for a team of promising juniors against Andrew Stoddart's touring English team at Sydney Cricket Ground.

Cricket career
In 1894/95 Trumper played for New South Wales against South Australia but made only 11 and 0 runs in his two innings. At his next attempt he also failed with the bat and was left out of representative cricket for two years. M. A. Noble, always a good judge, was confident about young Vic's ability, but it was only after some controversy that Trumper was made a last minute selection for the 1899 Australian team to England. He soon showed his ability, scoring 135 not out against England at Lord's Cricket Ground and 300 not out against Sussex. After the Lord's innings in June 1899, the great English batsman W. G. Grace approached the Australian dressing room and presented Trumper with his own bat, declaring, "From the present champion to the future champion." That bat now belongs to the Australian Museum collection in Canberra.

Trumper's most remarkable Test season was played in England in 1902. It was one of the wettest summers on record, yet Trumper in 53 innings scored 2,570 runs, and without a single not out had an average of 48.49. Harry Altham wrote: "From start to finish of the season, on every sort of wicket, against every sort of bowling, Trumper entranced the eye, inspired his side, demoralized his enemies, and made run-getting appear the easiest thing in the world."

C. B. Fry added, "He had no style, and yet he was all style. He had no fixed canonical method of play, he defied all orthodox rules, yet every stroke he played satisfied the ultimate criterion of style – the minimum of effort, the maximum of effect."

"No one," wrote Plum Warner, "ever played so naturally. Batting seemed just part of himself, and he was as modest as he was magnificent."

Trumper was modest, retiring and generous. A teetotaller and non-smoker, his general conduct was an example to his fellow players, and he was a great favourite with the public both in England and Australia. Monty Noble had no hesitation in calling him the world's greatest batsman, a genius without compare.

In 1902, in arguably his greatest innings, he became the first player to achieve the very rare feat of making a century on the first morning of a Test match, scoring 103 before lunch against England at Old Trafford.

In August 1904, Trumper, with Hanson Carter, opened a sports store in Market Street, Sydney. Trumper's health during this period declined to the point where he missed the 1908/09 season due to illness. In 1912 Trumper opened "Victor Trumper and Dodge Ltd.", a sports and mercery store in George Street, Sydney.

Some notable highlights of Trumper's career include scoring 292 against Tasmania, including a century before lunch (1908); scoring 100 in 58 minutes against Victoria (1906); 201 against South Australia (1913). His innings of 293 for an Australian XI against Canterbury (1914), scored in a little over three hours, was made in partnership with Arthur Sims (184 not out), and their stand of 433 still remains the record for the eighth wicket in first-class cricket, and Trumper's innings remains the highest score by a number nine batsman. His last 68 first-class innings, from 1910 to 1914, gave him an average of 60. His ability as a batsman, however, cannot be valued by averages or the number of runs scored. His mastership was shown on bad wickets, for when other batsmen were struggling merely to keep their wickets intact, he was still able to time the ball and execute strokes all round the wicket.

In February 1913 a match was played for his benefit between New South Wales and the rest of Australia which, with subscriptions, yielded nearly £3000.

Rugby League
Although he is best known for his prowess as a cricketer, Trumper was also a competent rugby player and can lay claim to being the prime mover in the development of rugby league in Australia. He hosted meetings at his store during 1907 as discontent amongst players with the game's administration grew louder. On 8 August 1907 at Bateman's Crystal Hotel, George Street, Sydney independent politician Henry Hoyle chaired a meeting of fifty, comprising several leading rugby players and officials. The New South Wales Rugby Football League, the body that would go on to conduct the major national rugby league premiership of Australia, was founded and Trumper was elected its first treasurer.

Death
Trumper's health declined rapidly in 1914 and he died as a result of Bright's disease in Darlinghurst, Sydney, on 28 June 1915, aged 37. Trumper was buried in Waverley Cemetery after the largest funeral procession ever seen in Sydney (with 250,000 mourners lining the route) and was survived by his wife Sarah, his son Victor and daughter Nancy.

Trumper's son, Victor Trumper Jr (1913–1981), played seven first-class games for New South Wales in 1940–41; he was also the uncle of Admiral Sir Victor Smith (1913–1998), the first Australian to be promoted to the rank of admiral.

Victor Thomas' maternal ancestry was of the Coughlin family which also included NSW's first female statistician and Australia's Northern Territory's Chief Minister Clare Martin. The family was originally from County Offaly, Ireland until the Cromwell invasion then left County Cork in the 1850s just after the Great Famine.

Recognition

Trumper was named a Wisden Cricketer of the Year in 1903.

He was awarded Life Membership of the New South Wales Rugby League in 1914.

In the 1963 edition of Wisden Cricketers' Almanack, Trumper was selected by Neville Cardus as one of the Six Giants of the Wisden Century. This was a special commemorative selection requested by Wisden for its 100th edition. The other five players chosen were Sydney Barnes, Don Bradman, W. G. Grace, Jack Hobbs and Tom Richardson.

In 1981 he was honoured on a postage stamp issued by Australia Post depicting a cartoon image by Tony Rafty.

In 1996 he was made one of the ten inaugural inductees into the Australian Cricket Hall of Fame, the others being Fred Spofforth, John Blackham, Clarrie Grimmett, Bill Ponsford, Sir Donald Bradman, Bill O'Reilly, Keith Miller, Ray Lindwall, and Dennis Lillee.

The Sydney Cricket Ground Trust announced on 12 June 2008 that the new grandstand on the old hill at the SCG was to be named in Trumper's honour.

On 2 November 2008 the SCG Trust hosted the first 'Victor Trumper Day', a sporting and cultural retrospective organised by Sydney school teacher David Strange to honour the life of Trumper on the 131st anniversary of his birth. Former internationals and celebrities including Greg Matthews, Stuart MacGill, Greg Page, Mick Molloy and Tim Farriss wore slatted pads, sausage gloves and 1907 skull caps to recreate the Golden Age of cricket and raise money for charity in Trumper's name.

On 30 September 2009, Victor Trumper was one of five new members announced as part of the growing class of the ICC Cricket Hall of Fame. On 4 January 2010, he was formally inducted into the Hall of Fame.

Trumper Park Oval in Paddington, New South Wales is named in his honour, as is the Trumper Pavilion at Chatswood Oval.

Notes

References

Further reading

External links

 
 Victor Trumper's death registration
 Online collection of Victor Trumper , State Library of New South Wales

1877 births
1915 deaths
Australian Cricket Hall of Fame inductees
Australia Test cricketers
New South Wales cricketers
Wisden Cricketers of the Year
Burials at Waverley Cemetery
Deaths from nephritis
Wisden Leading Cricketers in the World
Australian cricketers
D. G. Bradman's XI cricketers
Sport Australia Hall of Fame inductees